Christianity in Cyprus is the largest religion in the country, making up 78% of the island's population. The largest Christian denomination is the Greek Orthodox Church, while the rest are smaller communities of Anglicans, Roman Catholics, Latin Christians, Maronites, Armenian Apostolics, and Greek Evangelicals.

The Church of Cyprus

The most important church in Cyprus, the Church of Cyprus, is an autocephalous Greek Orthodox Church. While recognising the seniority and prestige of the Ecumenical Patriarch in Constantinople, it has enjoyed complete administrative autonomy under its own Archbishop since the 5th century. The Great Schism had major consequences for the Church of Cyprus. Under Lusignan and Venetian rule, the Church of Cyprus was pressured to recognize the authority of the pope. Under the British, there was an attempt to secularize all public institutions, but this move was bitterly opposed by Church authorities, who used the conflict with the colonial administration to gain leadership of the Greek nationalist movement in fighting for independence. At independence (1959–1960), Archbishop Makarios III, was elected president of the republic to hold the post until his death in 1977. 

The church had long been composed of four episcopal sees: the archbishopric of Nicosia, and the metropolitanates of Paphos, Kition, and Kyrenia. New metropolitanates were created by Makarios in 1973 for Limassol and Morphou, with a suffragan, or assistant, bishop in Salamis under the archbishop. A bishop had to be a graduate of the Orthodox theological seminary in Greece and be at least thirty years of age. Since Orthodox bishops were sworn to a vow of celibacy and parish clergy were usually married, bishops were recruits from monasteries rather than parish churches. Bishops were not appointed by the archbishop, but, like him, were elected through a system granting representation to laymen, other bishops, abbots, and regular clergy.

Individual churches, monasteries, dioceses, and charitable educational institutions organized by the Church of Cyprus were independent legal persons enjoying such rights and obligations as holding property. In exchange for many church lands acquired by the government, the government assumed responsibility for church salaries. Parish clergy, traditionally married men chosen by their fellow villagers, were sent for brief training before ordination. In the 20th century, modernizers, most notably Archbishop Makarios, were instrumental in strengthening the quality and training of priests at the Cypriot seminary in Nicosia.

The monasteries of Cyprus had always been very important to the Church of Cyprus. By the 20th century many had long lain in ruins, but their properties were among the most important holdings of the church, the island's largest landowner. Although the number of monks decreased in the postwar era, in the early 1990s there were at least ten active monasteries in the government-controlled areas.

In the Orthodox Church, liturgy is to a great extent the center of the church's activity, for Orthodox doctrine emphasizes the mystery of God's grace rather than salvation through works and knowledge. Seven sacraments are recognized: baptism in infancy, followed by confirmation with consecrated oil, penance, the Eucharist, matrimony, ordination, and unction in times of sickness or when near death.

Formal services are lengthy and colorful, with chanting, incense, and elaborate vestments according to the occasion for the presiding priest. The veneration of icons is done often, located on the church's walls and often covered with offerings of the faithful, is highly developed. Easter is the focus of the church year, closing the Lenten fasting with an Pascha Easter Eve vigil and procession. Marriage is a highly ritualized occasion. Formal divorce proceedings are required for broken engagements that have been ratified by the church. The wedding sponsors play an important role in the family, for they usually act as godparents of all children born of that union.

Religious observance varied. In traditional rural villages, women attended services more frequently than men, and elderly family members were usually responsible for fulfilling religious duties on behalf of the whole family. Church attendance among Greek Cypriots is relatively high, making the Republic of Cyprus one of the most religious countries in the European Union, along with Malta, Greece and Poland. For much of the population, religion centered on prayer at home, veneration of icons, and observance of certain feast days of the Orthodox calendar.

Oriental Orthodoxy in Cyprus
Throughout history, Oriental Orthodox Christianity was represented in Cyprus by Armenian, Syriac and Coptic communities.

Armenian Apostolic Church in Cyprus

The presence of Armenians in Cyprus dates back to 578. Currently, Armenian-Cypriots maintain a notable presence of about 3,500 persons, mainly inhabiting the urban areas of Nicosia, Larnaca and Limassol. Recently, some Armenian immigrants have settled Paphos.

The Armenian Prelature of Cyprus has had a continuous presence on the island since its establishment in 973 by Catholicos Khatchig I. This see was abolished in 1571, when the city was captured by the Ottomans. Traditionally, the Prelature has been under the jurisdiction of the Catholicosate of the Great House of Cilicia, while today it is the oldest theme that falls under its jurisdiction. Between the 12th and the 16th centuries, Armenians in Cyprus had a second Bishopric, located in Famagusta. Since 2014, the head of the Armenian Prelature is Archbishop Nareg Alemezian. The Prelature, which is housed on its own premises on Armenias street, Strovolos, Nicosia, next to Nareg School and the Virgin Mary church, has its own Charter and publishes the Keghart (Lance) newsletter.

The most important pilgrimage site is the Sourp Magar monastery, located on the Pentadaktylos mountain range in the north. The monastery was established c. 1000 and by 1425 it had passed into Armenian hands. Due to the 1974 Turkish invasion, the monastery has been abandoned and it is presently in a ruinous condition. By initiative of the Armenian MP Vartkes Mahdessian and the Armenian Ethnarchy, visits-pilgrimages have been organised annually since 2007; however, no Liturgy has been held since 1974.

Also in the Northern Cyprus are the historical churches of Notre Dame de Tyre in Nicosia (1308) and Ganchvor in Famagusta (1346). These two churches were abandoned by the Armenians in 1963, after the Cyprus crisis of 1963–64. The Notre Dame de Tyre church has undergone restoration, while the Ganchvor church is in need of restoration.

In the Republic of Cyprus-controlled areas of Cyprus, there is the cathedral of the Virgin Mary in Nicosia (1981), the church of Saint Stephen in Larnaca (1909) and the church of Saint George in Limassol (1939). In the Nicosia cathedral Liturgies are held regularly, while in the Larnaca and Limassol churches Liturgies are held every other Sunday.

In the vicinity of Nicosia there is also the chapel of Saint Paul (1892), the chapel of the Holy Resurrection (1938) and the chapel of the Saviour of All (1995). The oldest chapel celebrates once a year, while in the newest chapel Matins are held once a month. The middle chapel has not been celebrated since the 1974 Turkish invasion.

Syriac Orthodox Church in Cyprus
Cypriot Diocese of the Syriac Orthodox Church of Antioch was established in the thirteenth century, for Syriac refugees from the Levant and merchants from the Mosul region. The Syriac Orthodox Diocese of Cyprus existed until the seventeenth century.

Catholic Church

The Catholic Church in Cyprus is part of the worldwide Catholic Church under the spiritual leadership of the Pope in Rome. There are around 10,000 Catholics in Cyprus, corresponding to just over 1% of the population.

Most Catholics in Cyprus are Maronites (Eastern Rite Catholics). In the 1891 census, out of 209,286 Cypriots 1,131 were Maronites. In the 1960 census they were 2,752, in four villages all situated in the north of the island. Their present estimated population is about 6,000, of whom 150 live in the North.

Latin Rite Catholics of the Catholic Church in Cyprus are under the Latin Patriarch of Jerusalem, as the Latin Patriarchal Vicariate for Cyprus organised.

Protestantism

After the arrival of the British, the Anglican Church of Cyprus was established in 1878. As of 1976, it falls under the Diocese of Cyprus and the Gulf. Protestants, according to the official 2011 population census, amount to 2.00% of the population. Their Archdeacon is Dr John Holdsworth. Their cathedral in Nicosia is dedicated to Saint Paul, while they have their own churches in Limassol (Saint Barnabas) and Larnaca (Saint Helena), and they are using Ayia Kyriaki church in Paphos, St. Luke's church in Polis and St. Stephen's church in Tala.

With regard to Northern Cyprus, Turkish Cypriot Protestants are a very small community. The community numbers around five hundred and can be found living throughout northern Cyprus. The leader and Pastor of the community is Kemal Başaran. The vast majority of Protestants are Anglican and use Anglican churches in the Kyrenia area along with the island's British expatriate community. However, in recent years, the community are demanding their own Church. Despite the general tolerance of the native Turkish Cypriot community, the community faces threats and sometimes attacks at the hands of mainland Turkish settlers and by island nationalists.

References

Sources 

 
 
 
 Morroni, Furio: ′′Divina Cypria′′, Discovering the symbols of Christianity in Cyprus. Edited by Rosie Charalambous, Nicosia, Cyprus, 2020,